Moon Lake is a high mountain reservoir on the south slope of the High Uintas in Duchesne County, Utah. Recreation management is under the jurisdiction of the U.S. Forest Service, as the lake is part of the Ashley National Forest.

In 1938, the United States Bureau of Reclamation completed the earthen Moon Lake Dam on the Lake Fork River to expand the size of the existing natural lake for irrigation. The dam has a height of 98 feet, and the expanded reservoir a capacity of 49,500 acre-feet.

See also
 Uinta Indian Irrigation Project

References

Reservoirs in Utah
Lakes of Duchesne County, Utah
Tourist attractions in Duchesne County, Utah
Dams in Utah
United States Bureau of Reclamation dams
Dams completed in 1938